The Radeon HD 8000 series is a family of computer GPUs developed by AMD. AMD was initially rumored to release the family in the second quarter of 2013, with the cards manufactured on a 28 nm process and making use of the improved Graphics Core Next architecture. However the 8000 series turned out to be an OEM rebadge of the 7000 series (although Bonaire is a GCN 2.0 based chip, thus being of newer development).

Architecture 
The Radeon HD 7000 series was launched in 2011 and it marked AMD's shift from VLIW (TeraScale) to RISC/SIMD architecture (Graphics Core Next). The highend-mainstream cards were equipped with GCN-based chips while some of the mid-low end ones were just rebranded TeraScale-based cards. All of the GCN-based chips were made using the 28 nm process, becoming the first chips ever to be based on that technology. The GCN-based chips for desktop cards were codenamed as Southern Islands, while the mobile ones (again, only the GCN-based and not the rebranded ones) were codenamed as Solar System.

Multi-monitor support 

The AMD Eyefinity-branded on-die display controllers were introduced in September 2009 alongside the Radeon HD 5000 Series and have been present on all chips since then.

Video acceleration 
Both Unified Video Decoder (UVD) and Video Coding Engine (VCE) are present on all GCN-based chips (starting with the GCN 1.0 HD 7000 series). Both are fully supported by AMD Catalyst and by the free and open-source graphics device driver#ATI/AMD.

OpenCL (API) 
OpenCL accelerates many scientific Software Packages against CPU up to factor 10 or 100 and more.
OpenCL 1.0 to 1.2 are supported for all Chips with TeraScale and GCN Architecture. OpenCL 2.0 is supported with GCN 2nd Gen. or 1.2 and higher)   For OpenCL 2.1 and 2.2 only Driver Updates are necessary with OpenCL 2.0 conformant Cards.

Vulkan (API) 
API Vulkan 1.0 is supported for all with GCN Architecture. Vulkan 1.1 (GCN 2nd Gen. or 1.2 and higher) will be supported with actual drivers in 2018 (here only HD 8770).
On newer drivers Vulkan 1.1 on Windows and Linux is supported on all GCN-architecture based GPUs.
Vulkan 1.2 is available with Adrenalin 20.1 and Linux Mesa 20.0 for GCN 2nd Gen. or higher.

Chipset table

Desktop models 
 Graphics Core Next (GCN) supports the Mantle API and Vulkan API
 OpenGL 4.5 support for TeraScale 2 with AMD Crimson Beta (driver version 15.30 or higher)
 OpenGL 4.5 and Vulkan 1.0 support for GCN 1.0 and higher with AMD Crimson 16.3 or higher.
 Vulkan 1.1 support for GCN 1.0 and higher with AMD Adrenalin 18.3.3 or higher.

Mobile Models

Integrated Models

Radeon Feature Matrix

See also 
 Radeon HD 2000 Series
 Radeon HD 3000 Series
 Radeon HD 4000 Series
 Radeon HD 5000 Series
 Radeon HD 6000 Series
 Radeon HD 7000 Series
 Radeon Rx 200 Series
 Nvidia GeForce 700 Series
 List of AMD graphics processing units
 Free and open-source device drivers: graphics#ATI/AMD

References

External links 
 techPowerUp! GPU Database

AMD graphics cards
Computer-related introductions in 2013
GPGPU
Graphics hardware
Graphics processing units